Three of Them (Russian  "Three") is a 1901 novel by Maksim Gorky. The plot concerns Ilya Lunyev, a boy from an urban slum, who enters the middle-class milieu only to be disillusioned to find the same moral corruption.

References

1901 novels
Novels by Maxim Gorky